"Can We Get Enough?" is a song recorded by American German-based artist B.G., the Prince of Rap. It is one of his most successful songs and was released in 1993, as the first single from his second album, The Time Is Now (1994). Produced by German producer Jam El Mar, it peaked at number six in Italy, number 28 in Sweden and number 34 in Germany. On the Eurochart Hot 100, the song reached number 66 in August 1993. Outside Europe, it peaked at number 18 in Israel. A music video was also produced to promote the single.

Critical reception
Pan-European magazine Music & Media wrote, "This artist has established considerable credibility as one of the prime exponents of the German dance movement. A year's absence from the scene has caused no harm either, as witnessed by this fast-paced techno-rap with ambient overtones."

Track listing

Charts

References

1993 singles
1993 songs
B.G., the Prince of Rap songs
Dance Pool singles
English-language German songs